Cook County Board of Commissioners 8th district is a electoral district for the Cook County Board of Commissioners.

The district was established in 1994, when the board transitioned from holding elections in individual districts, as opposed to the previous practice of holding a set of two at-large elections (one for ten seats from the city of Chicago and another for seven seats from suburban Cook County).

Geography
Throughout its history, the district has been located in the Near Northwest Side of Chicago.

1994 boundaries
When the district was first established, it represented parts of the Near Northwest Side of Chicago.

2001 redistricting
New boundaries were adopted in August 2001, with redistricting taking place following the 2000 United States Census. The boundaries were entirely within the city of Chicago. It represented Near Northwest Chicago.

2012 redistricting
The district currently, as redistricted in 2012 following the 2010 United States Census, continued to be entirely located entirely within the city boundaries of Chicago, and largely resembled the shape that the district already had before the redistricting.

The district was 14.26 square miles (9,125.78 acres).

Politics
The district has only ever been represented by Democratic commissioners. Only once has another party run a nominee in an election in this district.

List of commissioners representing the district

Election results

|-
| colspan=16 style="text-align:center;" |Cook County Board of Commissioners 8th district general elections
|-
!Year
!Winning candidate
!Party
!Vote (pct)
!Opponent
!Party
! Vote (pct)
|-
|1994
| |Roberto Maldonado
| | Democratic
| | 
|
|
|
|-
|1998
| |Roberto Maldonado
| | Democratic
| | 31,356 (100%)
|
|
|
|-
|2002
| |Roberto Maldonado
| | Democratic
| |38,741 (100%)
|
|
|
|-
|2006
| |Roberto Maldonado
| | Democratic
| |38,795 (100%)
|
|
|
|-
|2010
| |Edwin Reyes
| | Democratic
| |37,147 (100%)
|
|
|
|-
|2014
| |Luis Arroyo Jr.
| | Democratic
| |37,529 (100%)
|
|
|
|-
|2018
| |Luis Arroyo Jr.
| | Democratic
| |73,296 (89.29%)
| | Walter Zarnecki
| | Republican
| | 8,792 (10.71%)
|-
|2022
| |Anthony Joel Quezada
| | Democratic
| |53,400 (100%)
|
|
|

References

Cook County Board of Commissioners districts
Constituencies established in 1994
1994 establishments in Illinois